Delaware County is a county located in the US state of New York. As of the 2020 United States census, the population was 44,308.  The county seat is Delhi. The county is named after the Delaware River, which was named in honor of Thomas West, 3rd Baron De La Warr, appointed governor of Virginia in 1609.

History

When counties were established in New York State in 1683, the present area of Delaware County was divided between Albany and Ulster Counties.

Albany County was an enormous county, including the northern part of New York State as well as all of the present State of Vermont and, in theory, extending westward to the Pacific Ocean. This county was reduced in size on July 3, 1766, by the creation of Cumberland County,  and further on March 16, 1770, by the creation of Gloucester County, both containing territory now in Vermont. On March 12, 1772, what was left of Albany County was split into three parts, one remaining under the name Albany County. One of the other pieces, Tryon County, contained the western portion (and thus, since no western boundary was specified, theoretically still extended west to the Pacific). The eastern boundary of Tryon County was approximately five miles west of the present city of Schenectady, and the county included the western part of the Adirondack Mountains and the area west of the West Branch of the Delaware River. The area then designated as Tryon County now includes 37 counties of New York State. The county was named for William Tryon, British colonial governor of New York.

In the years prior to 1776, most of the Loyalists in Tryon County fled to Canada. In 1784, following the peace treaty that ended the American Revolutionary War, the name of Tryon County was changed to Montgomery County to honor the general, Richard Montgomery, who had captured several places in Canada and died attempting to capture the city of Quebec, replacing the name of Tryon.

In 1789, Montgomery County was reduced in size by the splitting off of Ontario County. The actual area split off from Montgomery County was much larger than the present county, also including the present Allegany, Cattaraugus, Chautauqua, Erie, Genesee, Livingston, Monroe, Niagara, Orleans, Steuben, Wyoming, Yates, and part of Schuyler and Wayne Counties.

In 1791, Otsego was one of three counties that were split off from Montgomery (the other two being Herkimer and Tioga Counties).

Ulster County was an original county of New York State, considerably larger than the present Ulster County, and at the time that Delaware County was created it still contained most of its original area.

Delaware County was formed in 1797 by combining portions of Otsego and Ulster counties.

Geography
It is the fifth-largest county in New York by land area.

Delaware County is located in the southern part of the state, separated from the state of Pennsylvania by the Delaware River. It is east of Binghamton and southwest of Albany. The county contains part of the Catskill Mountains. The county is within a region called the Southern Tier of New York State.

The highest point is an approximately 3,520-foot (1,073 m) summit of Bearpen Mountain along the Greene County line. The lowest point is along the Delaware River. The county is drained by the headwaters of the Delaware. It has a hilly surface, and the soil in the valleys is exceedingly fertile. The Delaware and Susquehanna rivers are here navigable by boats.

Adjacent counties
 Otsego County – north
 Schoharie County – northeast
 Greene County – east
 Ulster County – southeast
 Sullivan County – south
 Wayne County, Pennsylvania – southwest
 Broome County – west
 Chenango County – northwest

National protected area
 Upper Delaware Scenic and Recreational River, (part)

Demographics

2020 Census

2000 census
As of the census of 2000, there were 48,055 people, 19,270 households, and 12,737 families residing in the county.  The population density was 13/km2 (33/sq mi), making it the least densely populated in the state outside of the Adirondacks.  There were 28,952 housing units at an average density of 20 per square mile (8/km2).  The racial makeup of the county was 96.44% White, 1.18% Black or African American, 0.31% Native American, 0.53% Asian, 0.01% Pacific Islander, 0.53% from other races, and 0.99% from two or more races.  2.05% of the population were Hispanic or Latino of any race. 23.9% were of English ancestry, 16.9% were of German ancestry and 14.1% were of Irish ancestry according to the 2012 Community Survey. 94.5% spoke English, 2.0% Spanish and 1.1% German as their first language.

There were 19,270 households, out of which 28.10% had children under the age of 18 living with them, 52.80% were married couples living together, 9.00% had a female householder with no husband present, and 33.90% were non-families. 28.30% of all households were made up of individuals, and 13.60% had someone living alone who was 65 years of age or older.  The average household size was 2.39 and the average family size was 2.90.

In the county, the population was spread out, with 23.10% under the age of 18, 8.20% from 18 to 24, 24.00% from 25 to 44, 26.20% from 45 to 64, and 18.60% who were 65 years of age or older.  The median age was 41 years. For every 100 females there were 97.00 males.  For every 100 females age 18 and over, there were 93.80 males.

The median income for a household in the county was $32,461, and the median income for a family was $39,695. Males had a median income of $27,732 versus $22,262 for females. The per capita income for the county was $17,357.  About 9.30% of families and 12.90% of the population were below the poverty line, including 18.60% of those under age 18 and 8.60% of those age 65 or over.

Education
The State University of New York at Delhi is located in Delaware County.
DCMO BOCES (Delaware-Chenango-Madison-Otsego; Board of Cooperative Educational Services) - Robert W. Harrold Campus is located in Sidney Center.

Transportation
Delaware County has some transportation operated by Coach USA.

Major highways

   Future Interstate 86/New York State Route 17 (Quickway)
  Interstate 88 (Senator Warren M. Anderson Expressway / Susquehanna Expressway)
  New York State Route 8
  New York State Route 10
  New York State Route 23
  New York State Route 28
  New York State Route 30
  New York State Route 97
  New York State Route 206

Communities

Larger settlements

† - County Seat

†† - Former Village

‡ - Not Wholly in this County

Towns

 Andes
 Bovina
 Colchester
 Davenport
 Delhi
 Deposit
 Franklin
 Hamden
 Hancock
 Harpersfield
 Kortright
 Masonville
 Meredith
 Middletown
 Roxbury
 Sidney
 Stamford
 Tompkins
 Walton

Unincorporated communities
 Agloe
 Arkville
 Bedell
 Delancey
 Fraser
 Grand Gorge
 Hawleys
 Halcottsville
 Islamberg
 Roxbury
 South Kortright

Politics
Delaware County typically votes for Republicans in local, state, and national elections. The county has voted for two Democratic presidential candidates in its history, Bill Clinton in 1996 and Lyndon B. Johnson in 1964. The last Democrat to win the majority of votes on the gubernatorial level was Andrew Cuomo in 2010.

|}

See also

 List of counties in New York
 National Register of Historic Places listings in Delaware County, New York

References

Further reading

External links

 Delaware County official site
 
 Delaware County, NY Genealogy and History Site
 Boy Scout Camp Serving County – Henderson Scout Reservation
 The Delaware County Fair, held every August in Walton, NY

 
Delaware County, New York
Counties of Appalachia
1797 establishments in New York (state)
Populated places established in 1797